WNXT (1260 AM) is a radio station broadcasting a sports format. Licensed to Portsmouth, Ohio, United States, the station is currently owned by Hometown Broadcasting of Portsmouth, Inc. and features programming from ABC Radio  and Fox Sports Radio.

History
WNXT went on the air in 1951. The history began when the original owner of WSAZ radio left to start a radio station in Portsmouth after WSAZ, as a radio station, became defunct.

Today's format
Today much of WNXT is dominated by Fox Sports Radio and local sports. The station dumped much of its country music in 2004 for ESPN Radio. The station has a major variety of both local and professional sports. Roger Gray and Jim Smith are some of the local sports personalities. During the fall and winter, Jim Smith does the local sports show, the Saturday Morning Sports-line, talking to local coaches via telephone line. WNXT is also an affiliate for Cincinnati Reds baseball, Ohio State University football and basketball and Columbus Blue Jackets hockey.

Community Corner
Local personality Gina Collinsworth hosts the Community Corner show on weekdays from 8:00am to 9:00am.

References

External links

NXT (AM)